"Glory Box" is a song by English electronic band Portishead, released on 2 January 1995 as the third and final single from their debut album, Dummy (1994). It samples "Ike's Rap II" by Isaac Hayes and peaked at number 13 on the UK Singles Chart.

Critical reception
In his weekly UK chart commentary, James Masterton said that "Glory Box" "is definitely one of the more gloriously slinky indie records released in ages". A reviewer from Music & Media commented: "Put the violin of the late Papa John Creach on top of it, and you get the Jefferson Airplane for the '90s. Based on a sample from Isaac Hayes's Isaac Moods it's 'suspense dance'." Maria Jimenez from the magazine's Short Grooves wrote: "This bluesy, emotional and hypnotic number is set to a very mellow, minimalistic and spacious hip hop musical backdrop. Potent vocals reminiscent of Cowboy Junkies and intense guitar energy and dub bass amplify the power of "Glory Box"." Andy Beevers from Music Week rated it four out of five, describing it as "another highly original and atmospheric song that is probably too downbeat and leftfield for daytime radioplay, but will still sell well". David Sinclair from The Times noted, "This is a strange, shimmering affair, which mixes a scratchy hip-hop rhythm track, descending bass line (a la Python Lee Jackson's "In a Broken Dream"), wailing blues guitar and the icily seductive vocals of Beth Gibbons into a highly addictive concoction."

Music video
The accompanying music video for the song was directed by Alexander Hemming and released on November 14. It is set in the 1950s, featuring lead singer Beth Gibbons as a jazz singer at a club while various office workers watch her perform. Sexual tension begins to rise between certain characters, as eventually, all of the workers, as separate couples, attend the club where Beth is performing. Apart from the band members, the entire cast of the video appears in drag.

The video for "Glory Box" was later published on Portishead's official YouTube channel in March 2015. It has amassed more than 19.7 million views as of September 2021.

In popular culture
John Martyn covered the song on his 1998 album, The Church with One Bell.

In 2020, musician Leo Moracchioli created a metal version of the song.

In 2021, Heineken released a commercial featuring 'Glory Box' starring actor Daniel Craig to mark the release of Craig's new film: No Time to Die, acknowledging the long wait that preceded the release of the film due to the COVID-19 pandemic.

One-man industrial metal band Author & Punisher covered the song on the 2022 album Krüller.

Impact and legacy
Slant Magazine listed the song at number 21 in their ranking of "The 100 Best Singles of the 1990s" in 2011, writing: "Second only to its flawless production, which includes a sample of Issac Hayes’s 'Ike’s Rap II', is Beth Gibbons’s impeccable lyrics and vocal performance on 'Glory Box'. Her voice sounding like it’s coming out of an antique radio, she’s at once coquettish and despondent, like a lounge singer delivering her final torch song before slinking off to her dressing room to drown her sorrow in booze and heroin. Her voice blossoms with momentary optimism during the second verse ('A thousand flowers could bloom!') and, of course, during the song’s rousing chorus: 'Give me a reason to love you/Give me a reason to be a woman.' A post-feminist anthem from the hungry, seedy depths of lust."

Track listings
 12"
Side one
"Glory Box"
"Scorn"
"Sheared Box"
Side two
"Strangers"
"Wandering Star"

 CD single
"Glory Box" (edit)		
"Toy Box"

 CD maxi
"Glory Box" (edit)
"Toy Box"
"Scorn"
"Sheared Box"

Charts

Weekly charts

Year-end charts

Certifications

References

Songs about heartache
1995 singles
Portishead (band) songs
Songs written by Isaac Hayes
Songs written by Geoff Barrow
Songs written by Beth Gibbons
Songs written by Adrian Utley